Changbhakar State, also known as Chang Bhakar, was one of the princely states of British Empire in India in the Chhattisgarh States Agency. Bharatpur was the capital of the princely state.

History
In 1790 Changbhakar zamindari or estate was carved out of Korea State. 
After the Anglo-Maratha war in the early nineteenth century, Changbhakar became a tributary state of British India. Changbhakar estate was recognized as a state in 1819 and was placed under the Chota Nagpur Tributary States in 1821. In October 1905, it was transferred and brought under the control of the Commissioner of Chhattisgarh division of Central Provinces. It acceded to the Union of India on 1 January 1948 and was placed under Surguja district of Central Provinces and Berar. Presently it is a Subdivision and a Tehsil of Koriya district of Chhattisgarh state.

Rulers
The rulers were Rajputs of the Chauhan dynasty. They had been formerly addressed as 'Raja', but from 1865 they used the title of 'Bhaiya'. 
1819 - 18..                Man Singh Deo 
1848 - 1865                Janjit Singh Deo 
 1 Dec 1865 - 1897         Balabhadra Singh Deo               (b. c.1825 - d. ... ) 
1897 - 1932                Mahabir Singh Deo                  (b. 1879 - d. 1932) 
1932 - 1947                Krishna Pratap Singh Deo
1932 - 1946               ... -Regent

See also
 Surguja State

References

External links
 Princely States of India

History of Chhattisgarh
Koriya district
Rajputs
Princely states of India
1790s establishments in India
1948 disestablishments in India